Jonathon Coleman (born March 9, 1975) is an American former professional ice hockey player. He ended his career playing for HC Eppan-Appiano of the Italian Serie B.

He was selected by the Detroit Red Wings in the 2nd round (48th overall) of the 1993 NHL Entry Draft.

Prior to turning professional, Coleman attended Boston University, where he played four seasons of college hockey with the NCAA Division I Boston University Terriers men's ice hockey team.

Career statistics

Awards and honors

References

External links

1975 births
Living people
American men's ice hockey defensemen
Detroit Red Wings draft picks
Adirondack Red Wings players
Ice hockey people from Boston
Amur Khabarovsk players
Boston University Terriers men's ice hockey players
Coventry Blaze players
Detroit Vipers players
Graz 99ers players
Kentucky Thoroughblades players
Kölner Haie players
Malmö Redhawks players
Nottingham Panthers players
Orlando Solar Bears (IHL) players
Providence Bruins players
Worcester IceCats players
HC Ambrì-Piotta players
NCAA men's ice hockey national champions
AHCA Division I men's ice hockey All-Americans